Mecas marmorata is a species of longhorn beetles, described by Charles Joseph Gahan in 1892. It is known to be from Mexico.

References

Saperdini
Beetles described in 1892